Bell Bay is an industrial centre and port located on the eastern shore of the Tamar River, in northern Tasmania, Australia. It lies just south of George Town. In the year ended June 2021, 3.6 million tonnes of exports and imports passed through Bell Bay.

History
Bell Bay Post Office opened on 18 September 1951 and closed in 1973.

Industry
Bell Bay has an aluminium smelter operated by Rio Tinto (previously by Comalco), and the Tasmanian Electro Metallurgical Company manganese alloy smelter operated by South32 (previously by BHP). The Bell Bay Power Station was decommissioned in 2009, replaced by the Tamar Valley Power Station built next door.

Transport
Bell Bay was connected to the Tasmanian Government Railways network in May 1974, when the 35 kilometre Bell Bay railway line opened, branching off the North East line at Nelson Creek to the north of Launceston. Primarily built to carry logs for export, today it carries intermodal containers to and from the port.

Berths
The first Bell Bay wharf was opened in 1927. Today it has seven berths including Long Reach South:

References

Bass Strait
Ports and harbours of Tasmania
Railway freight terminals in Australia
Tamar River
Towns in Tasmania
Localities of George Town Council